Sri Chautaria Fateh Jang Shah (1805 – 14 September 1846) or Fatya Jang Shah, also popularly known as Fatte Jang Chautariya, was the 6th prime minister of Nepal.

Early life and background
Fateh Jung Shah was born on 1805 A.D. as eldest son of Sri Chautaria Prana Shah and Chautaryani Moha Kumari Devi. He was 5th generation of King Prithvipati Shah of Gorkha. He was nephew of PM Chautariya Pushkar Shah. His 4 brothers were Colonel Sri Chautaria Guru Prasad Shah, Rajguru Ram Krishna Bahadur Shah, Captain Sardar Bir Bahadur Shah and Colonel Sri Chautaria Rana Sher Shah. His sister was Hiranya Garbha Devi, third wife of PM Jung Bahadur Rana. He was educated privately.

Works
He was appointed Mukhtiyar (1840-1843). He lived in exile at Gaya, India from 1843 to 1845. Later, he was promoted to Full General and Commander of Three Regiments in 1845 after the exile. He then served as Mukhtiyar and Minister of Foreign Affairs (1845-1846).

Children
He had three sons Sri Chautaria Khadga Bikram Shah (Khadga Babusaheb) who was killed with him at Kot Massacre. Other two are Guru Prasad Shah and Guna Bahadur Shah.

Death
He was killed in Kot Massacre at the courtyard of Hanuman Dhoka Palace on 14 September 1846.

See also
List of prime ministers of Nepal

References

Mukhtiyars
Assassinated heads of government
1805 births
1846 deaths
Assassinated people
19th-century Nepalese politicians
19th-century prime ministers of Nepal
Shah dynasty
Nepalese exiles